Orchestra United was a four-part British television series that followed a youth orchestra from its creation to a final, full-scale concert. The series was broadcast on Channel 4 during summer 2010.

The Hallé Harmony Youth Orchestra was formed from 75 young people (11 to 18 years of age) from Manchester who showed musical talent. The intention of its conductor, James Lowe, was to demonstrate that young people of all social, cultural and ethnic backgrounds could both enjoy and participate in major classical music. Two were selected to perform as soloists in a concert in the Hallé Orchestra's 2,000 seat Bridgewater Hall, an important concert venue in Manchester.

References
 Summary of series

External links
 

2010 British television series debuts
2010 British television series endings
2010s British documentary television series
2010s British music television series
Channel 4 documentary series
Classical music television series
English-language television shows